The South African Formula Atlantic Championship, was a Formula Atlantic motor racing championship held in South Africa between 1976 and 1979, including a race in Rhodesia during the 1976 (Non-Championship race) and 1977 seasons.

The final season ran between 1978 and 1979, starting just 5 months after the end of the 1978 season, and it was the longest season of the entire series, running from October 1978 to December 1979. 

The championship was dominated by Ian Scheckter and March as Scheckter drove a March chassis to each of the four drivers' championships.

South African Formula Atlantic Champions

External links
Old Racingcars

Formula racing series
Formula Atlantic
Auto racing series in South Africa
Motorsport in Rhodesia